Eldhose Kunnappilly is a politician from the state of Kerala in India. He is a member of Indian National Congress party. He was elected to the Kerala state legislative assembly in 2016 from the Constituency of Perumbavoor. He was also the District Panchayath president of Ernakulam from 2010 to 2015.

Controversies
Kerala Police registered a case against Eldhose Kunnappilly in October 2022 for allegedly sexually assaulting a young teacher.

References

Living people
People from Ernakulam district
Kerala MLAs 2016–2021
Indian National Congress politicians from Kerala
Year of birth missing (living people)
Place of birth missing (living people)